Speak Out, SpeakOut or Speaking Out may refer to:

Advocacy 
 SpeakOUT (Boston), LGBTQIA speakers' bureau in Boston, Mass (USA)

Media 
 Speak Out (album), by Bold
 "Speak Out Now", single from the 2011 self-titled album Oh, Land
 SpeakOut (TV program), debate show on The Filipino Channel
Speaking Out, program on ABC Radio Sydney
Speak Out, journal published by Speech Pathology Australia

Other 
 7-Eleven Speak Out Wireless, prepaid wireless service offered by 7-Eleven

See also 
 Speaking Out movement